Serbia and Montenegro debuted in the Eurovision Song Contest 2004 with the song "Lane moje" written by Leontina Vukomanović and Željko Joksimović. The song was performed by Željko Joksimović and the Ad-Hoc Orchestra. The union of public broadcasters of Serbia and Montenegro, Udruženje javnih radija i televizija (UJRT) organised the national final Evrop(j)esma 2004 in order to select the Serbia and Montenegro entry for the 2004 contest in Istanbul, Turkey. UJRT, the Serbian national broadcaster, Radio Television of Serbia (RTS), and the Montenegrin broadcaster Radio i televizija Crne Gore (RTCG) submitted a total of twenty-four entries to compete in the national final on 21 February 2004. "Lane moje" performed by Željko Joksimović was selected as the winner following the combination of votes from an eight-member jury panel and a public televote.

Serbia and Montenegro competed in the semi-final of the Eurovision Song Contest which took place on 12 May 2004. Performing during the show in position 20, "Lane moje" was announced among the top 10 entries of the semi-final and therefore qualified to compete in the final on 14 May. It was later revealed that Serbia and Montenegro placed first out of the 22 participating countries in the semi-final with 263 points. In the final, Serbia and Montenegro performed in position 5 and placed second out of the 24 participating countries, scoring 263 points.

Background 

The union of public broadcasters of Serbia and Montenegro, Udruženje javnih radija i televizija (UJRT) confirmed their intentions to debut at the 2004 Eurovision Song Contest after an application was submitted to take part in 2003 but was rejected due to late changes to the relegation procedure. Serbia and Montenegro had previously participated in the Eurovision Song Contest from 1961 to 1992 as part of Yugoslavia (later as FR Yugoslavia), winning in 1989 with "Rock Me" by Riva. UJRT would organise the selection process for the nation's entry with Serbia and Montenegro's respective broadcasters, Radio Television of Serbia (RTS) and Radio i televizija Crne Gore (RTCG), broadcasting the event within their respective republics. A national final titled Evropesma-Europjesma was used in order to select their 2004 entry.

Before Eurovision

Beovizija 2004 
Beovizija 2004 was the second edition of Beovizija. In 2004, the festival was used as the semi-final for Evropesma 2004, Serbia and Montenegro's national selection for their entry in the Eurovision Song Contest 2004. It was held on February 20 at the Sava Center in Belgrade, Serbia. The ceremonies were hosted by Aleksandar Srećković and Ksenija Balaban. The top 4 songs qualified for the final - they were chosen by 9 jury members (8 individuals and televoting/SMS voting being the 9th member). Negative, Leontina, Boris Režak and Nataša Kojić qualified for Evropesma. Jelena Jevremović was the televote/SMS vote winner.

Evropesma-Europjesma 2004 
Evropesma-Europjesma 2004 was the national final organised by UJRT in order to select the Serbian and Monetengrin entry for the Eurovision Song Contest 2004. The competition took place at the Sava Centarin Belgrade on 21 February 2004, hosted by Aleksandar Bojović and Nina Mudrinić. The show was broadcast in Serbia on RTS1 and RTS Sat as well as streamed online via the broadcaster's website rts.co.yu, and in Montenegro on TVCG 1 and TVCG Sat.

Competing entries 
UJRT together with the two broadcasters in Serbia and Montenegro, Serbian broadcaster RTS and Montenegrin broadcaster RTCG, each conducted separate selections in order to select the twenty-four entries to proceed to the national final: UJRT submitted sixteen entries, RTCG submitted four entries, while RTS organised Beovizija 2004 on 20 February 2004 where twenty-eight songs competed with the top four entries qualifying for the national final. Among the competing artists was Extra Nena who represented Yugoslavia in the Eurovision Song Contest 1992.

Final 
The final took place on 21 February 2004 where twenty-four songs competed. The winner, "Lane moje" performed by Željko Joksimović, was decided by a combination of votes from a jury panel (8/9) and the Serbia and Montenegro public via televoting (1/9). The Serbian jury consisted of Vlada Marković, Vojkan Borisavljević, Ana Miličević and Rade Radivojević, while the Montenegrin jury consisted of Nebojša Vujović, Stana Šalgo, Aco Đukanović and Radovan Papović. Former Eurovision contestant Johnny Logan, who won the contest for Ireland in 1980 and 1987, was featured as a guest performer during the show.

Controversy 
The competition caused some controversy as the Montenegrin acts did not receive any points from the Serbian jurors, while the Serbian Beovizija 2004 winner and runner-up, Negative and Boris Režak, did not receive any points from the Montenegrin jurors. However, the eventual winner Željko Joksimović received high points from both the Serbian and Montenegrin jurors.

At Eurovision

It was announced that the competition's format would be expanded to include a semi-final in 2004. According to the rules, all nations with the exceptions of the host country, the "Big Four" (France, Germany, Spain and the United Kingdom) and the ten highest placed finishers in the 2003 contest are required to qualify from the semi-final on 12 May 2004 in order to compete for the final on 15 May 2004; the top ten countries from the semi-final progress to the final. On 23 March 2004, a special allocation draw was held which determined the running order for the semi-final and Serbia and Montenegro was set to perform in position 20, following the entry from Denmark and before the entry from Bosnia and Herzegovina. At the end of the semi-final, Serbia was announced as having finished in the top 10 and subsequently qualifying for the grand final. It was later revealed that Serbia placed first in the semi-final, receiving a total of 263 points.

The draw for the running order of the final was decided during the announcement of the ten qualifying countries and Serbia and Montenegro was subsequently placed to perform in position 5, following the entry from France and before the entry from Malta. Serbia and Montenegro placed second in the final, scoring 263 points.

The semi-final and the final were broadcast in Serbia on RTS1 and RTS Sat with commentary by Duška Vučinić-Lučić, and in Montenegro on TVCG 2 and TVCG Sat with commentary by Dražen Bauković and Tamara Ivanković. The spokesperson who announced the votes of Serbia and Montenegro during the final was Nataša Miljković.

Voting 
Below is a breakdown of points awarded to Serbia and Montenegro and awarded by Serbia and Montenegro in the semi-final and grand final of the contest. The nation awarded its 12 points to Macedonia in the semi-final and the final of the contest.

Points awarded to Serbia and Montenegro

Points awarded by Serbia and Montenegro

References

External links
Serbia & Montenegro National Final page

2004
Countries in the Eurovision Song Contest 2004
Eurovision
Eurovision